Mount Mellenthin is a 12,645-foot (3,854 meter) elevation summit located in San Juan County of Utah, United States. Mount Mellenthin is the second-highest peak of the La Sal Mountains. It is situated in a dry, rugged, sparsely settled region, and set on land administered by Manti-La Sal National Forest. Precipitation runoff from this mountain drains into tributaries of the Colorado River. The nearest town is Moab,  to the northwest, and the nearest higher neighbor is Mount Peale,  to the south. The mountain's name honors Rudolf E. Mellenthin (1884–1918), forest ranger of La Sal National Forest, who was shot to death near this peak on August 23, 1918, while attempting to apprehend two draft evaders. This geographical feature's name was officially adopted in 1932 by the U.S. Board on Geographic Names.

Climate
Spring and fall are the most favorable seasons to visit Mount Mellenthin. According to the Köppen climate classification system, it is located in a Cold semi-arid climate zone, which is defined by the coldest month having an average mean temperature below 32 °F (0 °C), and at least 50% of the total annual precipitation being received during the spring and summer.

Gallery

See also

 Colorado Plateau
 List of mountain peaks of Utah

References

External links
 Weather forecast: Mount Mellenthin
 Rudolf Emil Mellenthin: Utahsfallen.org

Mellenthin
Mellenthin
Mellenthin
Mellenthin